Richard Kramer or Cramer may refer to:

Richard Kramer (judge) (born 1947), American superior court judge
Richard Kramer (writer) (born 1952), American screenwriter, novelist and television producer
Richard J. Kramer (born 1963), American businessman
Richard Cramer (1889–1960), actor
Richard Ben Cramer (1950–2013), American journalist and writer

See also
Dick Cramer, American baseball player
Rick Cramer, American golfer